Rustam Rezoyevich Abdulov (born 29 March 1973) is a former Russian football player.

Club career
He made his Russian Premier League debut for FC Lokomotiv Nizhny Novgorod on 7 March 1993 in a game against FC Zhemchuzhina Sochi.

References

1973 births
Living people
Russian footballers
FC Lokomotiv Nizhny Novgorod players
Russian Premier League players
Place of birth missing (living people)
Association football midfielders
FC Khimik Dzerzhinsk players